The 2004 Men's Olympic Water Polo Qualifying Tournament was a tournament to decide the remaining three competing teams at the 2004 Summer Olympics in Athens, Greece.

Teams

GROUP A
 
 
 

GROUP B

Preliminary round

GROUP A

January 25, 2004

January 26, 2004

January 27, 2004

January 28, 2004

January 29, 2004

GROUP B

January 25, 2004

January 26, 2004

January 27, 2004

January 28, 2004

January 29, 2004

Second round
January 30, 2004

Third round
January 31, 2004

Finals
February 1, 2004 — Ninth place

February 1, 2004 — Seventh place

February 1, 2004 — Fifth place

February 1, 2004 — Third place

February 1, 2004 — First place

Final ranking

Croatia, Germany and Russia qualified for the 2004 Summer Olympics in Athens, Greece

Individual awards
Most Valuable Player

Best Goalkeeper

Best Scorer
 — 13 goals

See also
 2004 Women's Water Polo Olympic Qualifier

References
  Results
 CDBA

qual
W
2004
W